The Bulgarian Olympic Committee (Balgarski olimpiyski komitet; abbreviated as БОК, BOC) is a non-profit organization serving as the National Olympic Committee of Bulgaria and a part of the International Olympic Committee.

History
The Bulgarian Olympic committee was formed on 30 March 1923 (with Bulgaria participating in the Olympic Games since the first modern Olympiad in 1896) and disbanded between September 1944 and 1952, since when it has continuously represented the country in the Olympic movement.

List of presidents

IOC Members

Member federations
The Bulgarian National Federations are the organizations that coordinate all aspects of their individual sports. They are responsible for training, competition and development of their sports. There are currently 29 Olympic Summer and 7 Winter Sport Federations in Bulgaria.

See also
 Bulgaria at the Olympics

External links 
 Official website

National Olympic Committees

1923 establishments in Bulgaria
Sports organizations established in 1923
Oly